Thiri Maha Sanda Dewi was a principal queen consort of King Mingyi Nyo of Toungoo Dynasty.

Brief
The queen was descended from the House of Mohnyin of Ava royalty from both sides.

The queen's personal name was Min Hla Htut. She was born in Salin where her father Thado Dhamma Yaza was viceroy and ruled ten towns of central Burma (present-day Magwe Region). In 1483, her father, who had been in revolt of his elder brother King Minkhaung II since 1481, died. Her uncle the king brought his nieces to Ava (Inwa), and raised them as his own. Min Hla Htut had an elder sister, Min Shwe Kyu, and a younger sister, Shin Htwe.

Her life at Ava ended a year after Minkhaung II's death in April 1501. The new king and her first cousin Narapati II was eager to retain the loyalty of his vassals. In 1502, Narapati II sent her off to Toungoo (Taungoo) in a marriage of state to Mingyi Nyo, Viceroy of Toungoo. At Toungoo, she became the second ranked vicereine of the ambitious viceroy. Mingyi Nyo was never more than a nominal vassal, and on 16 October 1510 formally declared independence. On 11 April 1511, Mingyi Nyo held his coronation ceremony, in which he bestowed Min Hla Htut the title of Thiri Maha Sanda Dewi. She had no children.

References

Bibliography
 
 

Queens consort of Toungoo dynasty
16th-century Burmese women
15th-century Burmese women